Hyposmocoma trifasciata is a species of moth of the family Cosmopterigidae. It was first described by Otto Swezey in 1915. It is endemic to the island of Hawaii. The type locality is Laupāhoehoe.

The larvae probably feed on lichen. It was reared from a larval case found on rocks at the top of a sea cliff. The larval case is about 3 mm long, oval, of white silk covered with minute particles of sand and dirt.

External links

trifasciata
Endemic moths of Hawaii
Moths described in 1915